The Allentown Rockets were an American basketball team based in Allentown, Pennsylvania that was a member of the Eastern Pennsylvania Basketball League.

Year-by-year

Basketball teams in Pennsylvania
Defunct basketball teams in the United States